Wether may refer to:

A castrated male goat
A castrated male sheep
A misspelling of weather
A misspelling of whether
Wether Down, a hill in Hampshire
Wether Hill (Lake District), a hill in Cumbria
Wether Holm (disambiguation)

See also
Wethers, a surname
Bellwether